Cristiano Fumagalli (born 28 July 1984 in Varese) is an Italian former professional road cyclist.

Major results

2002
 6th GP dell'Arno
2003
 2nd Gran Premio Inda
 3rd Giro del Canavese
2005
 7th Giro del Canavese
2006
 2nd Giro del Canavese
 3rd Gran Premio della Liberazione
 4th Trofeo Città di Brescia
2007
 3rd Trofeo Alcide Degasperi
 5th Coppa San Geo
 8th Giro Ciclistico del Cigno
2008
 3rd Trofeo Melinda
 10th Giro del Piemonte
2010
 8th Memorial Marco Pantani

References

External links

1984 births
Living people
Italian male cyclists
Cyclists from Varese